Bakhtabad-e Bala (also Romanized as Bakhtābād-e Bālā) is a village in Kakhk Rural District, Kakhk District, Gonabad County, Razavi Khorasan Province, Iran. At the 2006 census, its population was 15, in 5 families.

See also 

 List of cities, towns and villages in Razavi Khorasan Province

References 

Populated places in Gonabad County